Abiego is a municipality in the province of Huesca, in the autonomous community of Aragon, Spain. In 2018, it had a population of 237

Approaching Abiego along the road from Bierge, there is an interesting collection of in-situ fossil footprints dating from the late-Oligocene epoch (25 million years BP).

References

External links
Abiego website

Municipalities in the Province of Huesca